Mary Elizabeth Mastrantonio (born November 17, 1958) is an American actress. She made her Broadway debut in the 1980 revival of West Side Story, and went on to appear in the 1983 film Scarface as Al Pacino's character's sister, Gina Montana, which proved to be her breakout role. For her role as Carmen in the 1986 film The Color of Money, she was nominated for the Academy Award for Best Supporting Actress. Her other film roles include The Abyss (1989), Robin Hood: Prince of Thieves (1991), and The Perfect Storm (2000). In 2003, she was nominated for the Tony Award for Best Actress in a Musical for the Broadway revival of Man of La Mancha.

Early life
Mastrantonio was born in the Chicago suburb of Lombard, Illinois, to Frank A. Mastrantonio and Mary Dominica (née Pagone), both of Italian descent. Her father operated a bronze foundry. She was raised in Oak Park, Illinois, and studied drama at the University of Illinois. She worked summers at the Opryland USA theme park to earn money for college.

Career

Film
Mastrantonio first appeared on screen in Brian De Palma's Scarface (1983) as Gina, sister of Al Pacino's Tony Montana. She achieved prominence for her Oscar and Golden Globe-nominated role in The Color of Money (1986) opposite Paul Newman and Tom Cruise.

Her other featured roles include Slam Dance (1987), with Tom Hulce, and The January Man (1989) with Kevin Kline. She also starred in writer/director James Cameron's science fiction The Abyss (1989) with Ed Harris. She played Maid Marian in the film Robin Hood: Prince of Thieves (1991) with Kevin Costner. She played the attorney daughter of Gene Hackman's character in Class Action, co-starred in the 1992 thriller Consenting Adults, and played a fishing boat captain in The Perfect Storm (2000).

Stage
Mastrantonio has appeared on Broadway in various musicals, including West Side Story, Copperfield, The Human Comedy, and the 2002 revival of Man of La Mancha, where she played Aldonza/Dulcinea opposite Brian Stokes Mitchell. She has appeared in New York Shakespeare Festival productions of Henry V, Measure for Measure, and Twelfth Night. Her New York City stage performances brought her a Tony Award nomination and two Drama Desk Award nominations.

She also starred in Grand Hotel at the Donmar Warehouse in London's West End. In 1984, she was featured in a benefit performance of A Christmas Carol with Helen Hayes, Raul Julia, Harold Scott, F. MacIntyre Dixon, and Len Cariou at the Symphony Space in New York. In 2008, she starred in A View from the Bridge as Beatrice, with Ken Stott and Allan Corduner at the Duke of York's Theatre, London. On stage, she most recently starred in Ghosts as Helena Alving at the Seattle Repertory Theater.

Television
In 1991, Mastrantonio appeared as Yelena in a production of Uncle Vanya in the British anthology series Performance.

She had a recurring role during Seasons 4–5 (2005–2007) of the drama Without a Trace.

She played unit commander Capt. Zoe Callas in Season 9 (2010) of Law & Order: Criminal Intent.

Starting with the final episode of Season 1 (2012), she had a recurring role on Grimm, playing Kelly Burkhardt, mother of the show's protagonist.

In 2013, she guest-starred on Blue Bloods in the episode "Inside Jobs". She had a recurring role on the 2013–14 program Hostages, playing First Lady Mary Kincaid.

In 2015 she was cast in a leading role in Limitless on CBS, playing FBI Special Agent in Charge Nasreen "Naz" Pouran, which debuted on September 22, 2015.

In 2017 she guest-starred as Marion James, deputy director of the Central Intelligence Agency, in three episodes of Marvel's The Punisher on Netflix.

From 2018 to 2020, she starred as Madeline Burke on NBC's action drama Blindspot.

Personal life
Since 1990, Mastrantonio has been married to director Pat O'Connor, who directed The January Man; they have two sons.

Filmography

Film

Television

Stage

References

External links

 
 
 
 
 Mary Elizabeth Mastrantonio at the Internet Off-Broadway Database
 Yahoo! Movies: Mary Elizabeth Mastrantonio biography Retrieved 2012-08-28
 The Sunday Herald, 10 May 2009: Interview with Mary Elizabeth Mastrantonio Retrieved 2012-08-28

1958 births
20th-century American actresses
21st-century American actresses
Actors from Oak Park, Illinois
Actresses from Illinois
American expatriates in England
American women singers
American film actresses
American musical theatre actresses
American people of Italian descent
American television actresses
Living people
Musicians from Oak Park, Illinois
People from Lombard, Illinois